Thea Einöder (later Dr. Thea Straube, born 8 June 1951) is a German rower who competed for West Germany in the 1976 Summer Olympics.

Einöder was born in Regensburg in 1951. In 1976 she and her partner Edith Eckbauer won the bronze medal in the coxless pair event.

References

1951 births
Living people
Olympic rowers of West Germany
Rowers at the 1976 Summer Olympics
Olympic bronze medalists for West Germany
Olympic medalists in rowing
West German female rowers
Medalists at the 1976 Summer Olympics
World Rowing Championships medalists for West Germany